Higham Ferrers is a market town and civil parish in the Nene Valley in North Northamptonshire, England, close to the Cambridgeshire and Bedfordshire borders. It forms a single built-up area with Rushden to the south and had a population of 8,827 at the 2021 census . The town centre contains many historic buildings around the Market Square and College Street.

History
The town's name means 'High homestead/village'. The Ferrers family are mentioned in connection with the town in 1166. The hundred is named after Higham Ferrers, but the site of the meeting-place is unknown.

The first Charter of 1251 was due to the Lord of the Manor, William de Ferrers, who created the Borough in order to promote a prosperous community at the gates of his castle, where people had begun to settle in numbers and to trade in the ancient market.

Henry Chichele (c. 1364 – 12 April 1443) was born in Higham Ferrers. He was Archbishop of Canterbury and founded All Souls College, Oxford.

In 1422 Higham Ferrers School was founded.

The second Charter was granted in 1556 in the reign of Mary Tudor. For many years the town provided a safe seat in Parliament for a supporter of the Crown nominated by the Duchy of Lancaster, the biggest landowner. When James I came to the throne the town obtained a confirmation and further extension of civic powers and liberties by the Charter of 1604. Again after the Restoration of Charles II to the throne and the passing of the Corporations Act of 1661 the liberties were confirmed and extended.

The town was a rotten borough and sent one MP to the unreformed House of Commons until it was stripped of its representation by the Reform Act 1832.

After the Municipal Corporations Act 1882, the modern Charter of Queen Victoria reorganised the composition of the Corporation on modern lines to conform to the pattern of local government laid down in that Act. This Charter is the only one of the town's charters written in English: the earlier charters were in Latin.

The castle is thought to have been built not long after the Norman Conquest in 1066. However towards the end of the 15th century the castle suffered years of neglect. It was finally demolished in 1523 and the stone removed to build Kimbolton Castle. A grass bank and a pond are all that remain of the defensive earthworks and moat. In the garden of the Green Dragon Inn, formerly within the area of the outer ward of the castle, are the remains of a rectangular dove-house.

Higham Ferrers is twinned with Hachenburg in Germany.

Transport and communication
Historically, the town was at the crossroads of the A45 east–west route from Northampton to Cambridge, and the A6 north–south road from London to Leicester. It was a busy junction as both were long-distance transport corridors. The A45 bypassed the town in the early 1990s with a dual-carriageway, the former route (through the narrow, but beautiful streets of Kimbolton) becoming the B645. As the A6 carried less traffic, a bypass around Higham Ferrers and Rushden came later, opening on 14 August 2003, with the old road through both towns becoming the A5028.

Higham Ferrers railway station was the terminus of a short (5.25 mile) railway branch line on the Midland Railway from Wellingborough. There was an intermediate station at Rushden. The station closed to passenger services in 1959 and closed completely in 1969 with the end of goods services. Today, the nearest operational railway station is at Wellingborough about four miles away, but there is no bus route connecting Higham Ferrers to Wellingborough station.

Higham Ferrers is served by the BT Rushden telephone exchange which has been enabled for local-loop unbundling. However, due to the length of telephone lines, the north of the town furthest from the exchange can only achieve around 3Mbit/s as it suffers from high attenuation. BT have assigned the Rushden exchange to the FTTC (Fibre-to-the-Cabinet) upgrade programme (Phase 4b) due to commence in December 2010.

Commerce and civic buildings
The town is unusual in the UK if not Europe in having been a centre of short-run footwear production along with its neighbours of Rushden and Northampton. This trade was much reduced in the 1980s-2000s by a high exchange rate, but specialised firms and individual trades people remain in the area.

Higham Ferrers Farmer's Market is held on the last Saturday of each month, except in December when it is moved to the last available day before Christmas. Higham Ferrers Farmer's Market is a Certified Farmer's Market, and is part of the FARMA organisation.

Higham Ferrers Public Library is on Midland Road. The Town Hall is on The Market Square and was built in 1808 to replace an earlier building.

Higham Ferrers Church is located on wood street.

Sports
 Rushden & Higham RUFC was founded in 1951 and is currently based on the Bedford Road in Rushden with a 1st XV, 2nd XV, 3rd XV and Colts XV.
 Rushden and Higham United Football Club, the successor to both Higham Town and Rushden Rangers clubs, are members of the Hereward Teamwear United Counties League and have their ground at Hayden Road.
 Higham Ferrers Town Cricket Club, based at the recreation ground on Vinehill Drive, was established in 1881 and has a 1st XI and 2nd XI as well as an under 17s XI and under 15s XI.
 Higham Ferrers Town Bowls Club was founded in 1946 and is also at the recreation ground on Vinehill Drive.

Education
 Alpha Pre-School on Westfield Terrace is a committee-run community school and has been running for over 40 years, providing part-time nursery places.
 Higham Ferrers Nursery and Infant School on Wharf Road has a Nursery unit with 52 part-time places for pre-school children and 3 classes of about 25 pupils per year group: Reception and Years 1 and 2 (roughly ages 3 to 7). This is a feeder infant school for Higham Ferrers Junior School.
 Higham Ferrers Junior School on the corner of Wharf Road and Saffron Road has classes for Years 3 to 6 but 3 and 4 and 5 and 6 share classes (roughly ages 7 to 11).
 Henry Chichele Primary School is on the new estate to the north of the town on School Lane and has a single class per year for Reception, and Years 1 to 6 (roughly ages 4 to 11). 
 The Ferrers School is on Queensway and caters for Years 7 to 13 (ages 11 to 18).
 Moulton college can be found on the outskirts of Higham Ferrers

Politics
The Council consists of 16 elected Councillors and elects a Mayor and Deputy Mayor at the Annual Meeting of the Council in May of each year.

Notable buildings

St. Mary the Virgin

Chichele College
Chichele College was founded by Henry Chichele, an Archbishop of Canterbury, in 1422 as a college for secular canons. The College had provision for 8 priests, 4 clerks, 6 choristers and a song and grammar master. In later times the college became an inn, and then later a farm. The gatehouse, chapel and other remains of the college buildings survive, save for one hall now used for artistic exhibitions.

The Bede House
About the year 1422, when planning his college at Higham Ferrers, Archbishop Henry Chichele founded "In a place adjoining the Vicarage and the Churchyard", his Bede House or Hospital to be a dwelling place for 12 men over 50 years old to live "in close company", with one woman to look after them. It consisted of a common open Hall. Each man had his little cubicle with its locker, divided off by a screen from his fellows, and the rest of the Hall formed a common room with a fine open fireplace, itself a relic of even older times. On the South, a sheltered garden was added by taking part of the land of the Vicarage.

Notable residents
Henry Chichele (c. 1362–1443), Archbishop of Canterbury (1414–1443) and diplomat
Donald Pack FRSE (1920–2016), professor, mathematician and expert on supersonic air waves, was born and raised here.
Alice Maud Shipley (1869-1951), militant suffragette was born here.

Freedom of the Town
The following people and military units have received the Freedom of the Town of Higham Ferrers.

Individuals
 Derek Lawson : 18 February 2022.
 Richard Gell: 18 February 2022.

References

External links

 Higham Ferrers Town Council

Market towns in Northamptonshire
Rushden
Towns in Northamptonshire
North Northamptonshire
Civil parishes in Northamptonshire